Jayant Kumar Malaiya (born 20 February 1947) is an Indian politician and a member of the Bharatiya Janata Party. He was a member of Madhya Pradesh Legislative Assembly from Damoh constituency since 1990, but lost in 2018 Madhya Pradesh Assembly election.

Political career 
Malaiya was elected from Damoh Legislative Assembly for the first time in the sub-election for the seventh assembly in 1984. He was re-elected to the ninth, tenth, eleventh and twelfth Assemblies in 1990, 1993, 1998 and 2003 respectively. Malaiya was elected for the sixth time from the same constituency in the 2008 election. 
Malaiya was Minister of State for Housing and Environment (Independent Charge) during the Ninth Legislative Assembly. He was a special invitee to the Bharatiya Janata Party (BJP) District Damoh twice, the President of the State BJP Work Committee.
He chaired the Loklokha Committee in Eleventh Legislative Assembly of the state. Malaiya joined the Cabinet of then Chief Minister Uma Bharti on 28 June 2004 and was the Minister of Urban Administration and Development. He was sworn in as a minister in the Cabinet of Chief Minister Babulal Gaur on 27 August 2004. Malaiya was re-elected as a minister in the Cabinet of then Chief Minister Shivraj Singh Chauhan on 4 December 2005.
In the thirteenth assembly elections in 2008, he was re-elected from Damoh assembly constituency. Jayant Malaiya served as the Minister in the Cabinet of Chief Minister Shivraj Singh Chauhan on 20 December 2008.
He was elected as a member of Damoh for the Chaturdash Assembly in 2013. He took oath as Cabinet minister on 21 December 2013.

See also
 Shivraj Singh Chouhan Third ministry (2013–)

References

Living people
1947 births
Bharatiya Janata Party politicians from Madhya Pradesh
State cabinet ministers of Madhya Pradesh
People from Sagar, Madhya Pradesh